Old Swinford Hospital is a secondary boarding school in Oldswinford, Stourbridge, West Midlands, England  that has been in continuous operation since the 17th century. It is one of 36 state boarding schools in England, meaning school fees are funded by the LEA and pupils only pay boarding fees. Girls are admitted into the sixth form as day pupils. Girls will be admitted from year 7 onwards in 2021.

History 
Old Swinford Hospital opened in the late summer of 1667. Originally called Stourbridge Hospital, it was founded by Thomas Foley, an ironmaster and prominent local landowner, whose main estate was at Great Witley, west of Stourport in Worcestershire, but with strong Stourbridge connections. It was to educate 60 boys from "poor but honest" families nominated by specified parishes in Worcestershire, Staffordshire and Warwickshire. The school was sometimes named as Foley's blue coat school or hospital, or Oldswinford Hospital Endowed School. The school had increased to 70 boys by 1868.

Houses
The school consists of eight boarding houses:

There is one junior boarding house, Prospect House, which is for Year 7 boarders and one senior boarding house, Foster House, which is for Year 13 boarders. Foster was previously a boarding house for years 8-13 and reopened in October 2016 following redevelopment. The other six houses (Baxter, Dudley, Foley, Maybury, Potter and Witley) house boarders from year 8 to 12.

Before the houses were associated with buildings, there was also a Lyttelton house, named after the Lyttelton family who built nearby Hagley Hall. Katherine Lady Lyttelton and her son Sir Henry Lyttelton, sold the manor of Old Swinford to Thomas Foley in 1661. In the mid-20th century, when day boys outnumbered boarders, there were also day houses called Stone and Chance. Stone and Lyttleton are now the names of teaching blocks at the school.
Maybury boarding house closed down in 2017 and was later converted to a day student house for Year 7 day students

Admissions

There is no catchment area and admission is non-selective except for Flexi-Boarders in Year 7.  Boarding fees and day student facilities are charged but not tuition.

Sixth Form 
The school also offers a Sixth Form to which girls are admitted. Applications externally were subject to an entrance exam, which was dropped for students entering September 2015, and GCSE grades equivalent to 7 'A' grades. Boarding places are guaranteed for previous boarders. There is a minimum standard of 7 'C' grades at GCSE expected; this requirement can be waived if the pupil contributes to the school in other ways such as such as sport or music.

Academics

Old Swinford Hospital is a specialist Business and Enterprise School, a Specialist Science School and has recently been awarded an Artsmark and Sportsmark.

Foreign Language lessons are also compulsory and are offered as options to sixth form students as Spanish, French and German. Old Swinford Hospital has foreign language assistants, who come as native speakers of the language to teach and help at the school.

GCSEs are taken in Year 11. Lower Sixth take AS Levels, and Upper Sixth take A-Levels. Most Lower Sixth take 3 courses, and Upper Sixth take those same 3 Courses.

Old Swinford Hospital is placed in the top 5% of all schools at GCSE and with a strong record at A level. In October 2006, OFSTED rated the school as Outstanding. The most recent judgement, in 2017, judged the school as Good.

Upon publication of the 2007/2008 academic year results tables, Old Swinford Hospital were the best school in the Dudley local area for pass and success rates in GCSEs with 89% of pupils gaining 5 or more A*-C grades. A Level students also performed well with 99% of examinations taken passed, and an average point score per pupil of 805.8; significantly higher than the Dudley local average of 733.1 For 2010, it remained the highest performing school in the Dudley borough with 94% of GCSE students gaining 5 or more GCSEs at grade C or above.

Sport 

The main school sport is rugby; the school has reached the Semi-Finals in the U15 and U18 Daily Mail Cup, reaching the final in the U18 cup in 2012, and winning many other cups. From Michaelmas term the sport is played, with Sevens being played late in the Lent term. Other top level sports include hockey, and cross country. Cross country had a successful 2007/2008 season, winning trophies in both 1st and 2nd team categories. The school runs 3 senior football teams which are coached by former professional footballer Dale Rudge.

In Summer the main school sport is cricket. David Banks, the former Worcestershire, Warwickshire and Staffordshire cricketer is a member of the teams coaching staff.

In 2011-2012 the Basketball team suffered only 2 defeats in the entire season. The juniors are coached by Barrie Mann.

Other sports include Golf (Old Swinford Hospital owns Stourbridge Golf Club), Squash, Tennis, Rounders, Athletics, Volleyball, hockey and Mountain Biking.

Shooting is a sport also offered at the school.

International links
Old Swinford Hospital has international links with schools and educational establishments abroad. The three most notable are in the table below. Old Swinford has a history of raising money, and assisting in many ways with St. John's Secondary School in Nandere, Uganda through various charitable events and days and through the Uganda Link society. When the school had power issues in 2007, Old Swinford managed to raise the money needed to get power supplies back within one day.

Old Foleyans

Former students of the school are called Old Foleyans after the founder of the school, Thomas Foley.

Arts
Nicholas Bailey - Actor - performed in Coronation Street, Casualty, EastEnders.
Charles McKeown - Academy award nominated actor and writer. Films include, Brazil (1985), Spies Like Us, Time Bandits, The Missionary and Life Of Brian.

Media
Matthew Chance - Journalist - International correspondent for CNN

Military
 Roi Wilson - Captain RN

Politics
Philip Davies - Conservative MP for Shipley
Mike Wood - Conservative MP for Dudley South 2015

Sport
James Collins- Rugby player for Worcester Warriors
Rhys Crane - Rugby player for Sale Sharks
Paul Doran-Jones - Rugby player for England and Northampton Saints
Simon Green (cricketer)
Dean Headley - Former England cricketer
Hannah Payton - Professional cyclist
Chris Pennell - Rugby player for Worcester Warriors
George Robson - Rugby player for Harlequins
Joe Shaw - Rugby player for Newcastle Falcons
Max Stelling Centre for Worcester Warriors 
Richard West - Former England Rugby Player
Adam Finch - Professional Cricketer for Worcester Country Cricket
Oliver Lawrence - Rugby player for Worcester Warriors

Other
William Henry Bury - Murderer and Jack the Ripper suspect

Headmasters since 1667
Mr W. Broadhurst (1667–1682)
Mr J. Pearkes (1682–1727)
Mr T. Hill (1727–1748)
Mr J. Price (1748–1787)
Mr E. Sherriff (1787–1802)
Mr J. Hodges (1802–1818)
Mr J. Fisher (1818–1835)
Mr J. Brindley (1835–1839)
Mr W. Dixon (1839–1846)
Mr W. Evans (1846–1849)
Mr J. Anderson (1849–1876)
Mr T. Pardoe (1876–1883)
Mr WJ Maybury (1883–1928)
Mr HC Stone (1928–1951)
Mr Lawrence Sheppard MBE (1951–1978)
Mr Christopher Potter OBE (1978–2001)
Mr Melvyn Roffe (2001–2007)
Mr Peter Jones (2007–2014)
Mr Paul Kilbride (2014–current)

See also
Old Swinford Hospital RFC

External links
 Old Swinford Hospital official website
 Stained Glass Window in the Great Hall
 Old Foleyans' Association
 School Leagues BBC

References

Boys' schools in the West Midlands (county)
Boarding schools in the West Midlands (county)
Educational institutions established in the 1660s
1667 establishments in England
Bluecoat schools
Stourbridge
Secondary schools in the Metropolitan Borough of Dudley
Voluntary aided schools in England